Protivin may mean:

 Protivín, a town in the South Bohemian Region of the Czech Republic
 Protivin, Iowa, a small town in Chickasaw County, Iowa, USA